The Iveco Daily is a large light commercial van produced by the Italian automaker Iveco since 1978; it was also sold as the Fiat Daily by Fiat until 1983. Unlike the more car-like unibody Fiat Ducato, the Daily uses a separate ladder frame typical of heavier commercial vehicles. The Iveco Daily is produced at the Iveco Suzzara plant, near Mantova in Italy, where Iveco has recently made substantial investments to renew the production lines.

The Daily is also the longest-running vehicle of the Iveco production and in over 40 years have sold over three million units. Today it is marketed in 110 markets around the world.

First generation (1978)

Fiat Daily (1978)

In 1978, Fiat presented a revolutionary vehicle called Daily. Light utility, succeeding the old Fiat 242 and Fiat 616N, it immediately received a very favorable reception from users, who appreciated its excellent qualities of robustness and versatility. Its transformations for specific uses are numerous: panel van, chassis cab, double cab, etc.

When presented, the Daily was marketed as the Fiat Daily, OM Grinta, and later the turbocharged version OM TurboGrinta, and Alfa Romeo AR8 in Italy, Unic Daily in France, Magirus Daily in Germany, and in Switzerland, these were also sold by Saurer-Fiat and Saurer-OM as the Daily/Grinta, with the small IVECO I logo at the bottom to the right of the grille, until 1982. Between 1982 and 1983, the IVECO logo prevails in the center of the grille, the Fiat or Unic brands being simply recalled at the bottom right.

When it was launched, the Daily range included 3 models: 30F8, 35F8 and 40F8. The first number represents the GVW of the vehicle expressed in Italian fashion, in quintals, i.e. 3.0, 3.5 and 4.0 tonnes. The "F" indicates FIAT, the engine manufacturer and the last digit corresponds to the engine power expressed in ten horsepower DIN.

Depending on its configuration, the useful volume of the long van version can reach 17 m3, which makes it a good successor to the Fiat 242 (Citroën C35 in France), whose production nevertheless continued.

In 1984, Fiat V.I., now IVECO, presented the Daily 4x4 range and, in 1985, launched the second Daily series, the TurboDaily.

Iveco TurboDaily (1985)

In 1985, Iveco presented the turbodiesel version, called TurboDaily. To cover demand under 3.5 tonnes, reserved for the commercial vehicle division, Fiat Professional also launched the Fiat Ducato.

Engines
 2.5 L diesel  at 4200 rpm,  at 2400 rpm
 2.5 L turbodiesel  at 4100 rpm,  at 2300 rpm
 2.5 L diesel I.D.  at 4200 rpm,  at 2200 rpm (only in Zastava Rival)

Facelift

The facelift of the first generation Daily was introduced in 1990, with a totally revised cab and improvements on the Sofim engine (at that time, with a 2.5 L capacity). Following the entry of Ford's commercial operation into Iveco, in 1986, The Daily 3.5 ton was soon removed from the UK market as it was now direct competition with Ford's Transit, the Daily stayed on in the UK at rated above 4.0 ton, and now sold as the Iveco-Ford Daily. The Daily has no other connection with the Transit. Functionally, the Daily bridged the gap between the Transit and Cargo ranges. Turbodiesel versions are called "TurboDaily."

The facelift of the 1º generation was facelifted in 1996; it differs only slightly exterior-wise, but the engine was now available in 2.8-litre capacity . The 59-12 (chassis cabs and panel vans) and 59-13 (minibus) models were launched (GVW 6.4 tons). All-wheel-drive variants were also made available.

Engines
 2.5 L diesel  at 4,200 rpm
 2.5 L turbodiesel  at 3,800 rpm
 2.5 L tdi  at 3,800 rpm
 2.8 L diesel 
 2.8 L turbodiesel  at 3,600 rpm
 2.8 L tdi  at 3,600 rpm

Chinese production
Since 1991, the Daily has been license built in China by Nanjing Automobile subsidiary Naveco. The model was sold as the Deyi (得意), and later spawned modernized facelift variants called the Xindeyi (新得意, New Daily) in 2011 and 2017.

Facelift

Second generation (1999)

With second series the Daily got new light groups (wider and lower). The Turbodaily name was dropped as all turbodiesels came with Unijet technology (common rail). Two new versions were released: "Agile", with automatic gearshift, and "CNG", a natural gas version. Also two new load classes were introduced: Daily 65 and Daily 28 (6.5 tons and 2.8 tons). The Iveco Daily was made "Van of the Year" for the year 2000.

The second generation of the Iveco Daily and the first generation of the Renault Mascott share many panels and some components of the cab, including the doors due to an agreement between Iveco and Renault stipulated in July 1994. The agreement provided for the production and sharing of common components for a total of 120 thousand pieces a year produced in the various factories of Brescia (Italy, Iveco), Suzzara (Italy, Iveco), Valladolid (Spain, Iveco) and Batilly (France, SoVAB Renault factory). The Daily continued to be sold as an Iveco-Ford in the United Kingdom until 2006 when Ford dropped out of the medium/heavy duty commercial van market with no successor.

Engines 
Originally there were models with three engine options, all of type 8140 of 2.8 liters. The last variant gave  and had common rail injection.

At this time, the old 8140-engine was completely replaced.

Transmissions 
The motors up to  had five-speed gearbox, while the more powerful engines also available with a six-speed gearbox. The model could also be obtained with electronic / hydraulic controlled manual gearbox, called Agile.

First facelift

The 1º facelift of the second generation was designed by Giugiaro and arrived to markets in the middle of 2006. It's available as: Van, cabin cruiser, Combi, Minibus, Agile, and CNG. The minibus is also commercialized with the Irisbus brand. Certain models with clean engines have been sold as the "Iveco EcoDaily" in some European markets.

For the first time since the year 2000, an all-wheel-drive version of the Daily is available starting from 2007.

Electric version
A version powered by a 30 kW (40 HP) electric motor (60 kW peak) supplied by a battery with a capacity of 76 Ah and 21.2 kWh was announced in August 2010.

Engines
 2.3 HPI  and 
 2.3 HPT  diesel
 3.0 HPI 
 3.0 HPT 
 3.0 CNG

Second facelift

The second facelift of the 2º generation was introduced 29 June 2011 and came into the market at the beginning of September 2011.

Engines
Euro 5
 2.3 L  /270 Nm
 2.3 L  /320 Nm
 2.3 L  /350 Nm
 3.0 L  /350 Nm
 3.0 L  /400 Nm
 3.0 L  /470 Nm

EEV
 3.0 L  /370 Nm
 3.0 L  /400 Nm
 3.0 L CNG  /350 Nm

Chinese production
Since 2009, the third generation Daily has been the base of the Turin (都灵) and later the Power Daily (宝迪) variant by Nanjing Automobile subsidiary Naveco. The model was sold until 2013 and received a modernized facelift variant sold starting from 2014 to 2017. An electric van variant of Power Daily was also available from 2018 and ended in 2021.

Facelift

Iveco Daily Ousheng
A version produced by Naveco (Nanjing Iveco) of China called the Iveco Daily Ousheng (欧胜) was a facelift based on the second facelift of the Iveco Daily, and extended production starting from 2017. A mini bus variant called the Oufeng was also available in China.
The RV version of the Iveco Daily Ousheng called the Daily Ousheng Tourist RV was rebadged by Maxus and sold as the Maxus H90 in China.

Third generation (2014)

The third generation Daily was introduced in July 2014. Compared to the previous model, the vehicle has been completely revised; only the range of engines was retained. The selection of body variants, dimensions, wheelbases and payloads has been significantly expanded. According to the manufacturer, 8,000 variants are now available. The high loading area caused by the ladder frame on the Daily V has now been lowered by 55 mm and the often criticized long overhangs have been reduced. To improve driving comfort, the wheel suspension has been redesigned and the seating position of the driver's seat has been improved. The vehicle design was also redesigned and adapted to the requirements of aerodynamics. The standard equipment includes Electronic Stability Control; other safety features such as lane departure warning and a reversing camera are available as options. Also optional is a pneumatic rear suspension designed to make loading and unloading easier. This model received the International Van of the Year award in 2015.

Electric version

Available as a panel van, minibus and chassis, the Iveco Daily Electric is a purely electrically powered vehicle. It is optionally equipped with a 60 or 80 kW electric motor. It takes 10 hours to charge the ZEBRA batteries, or 2 hours in the shortened quick charge mode. The low-noise vehicle is advertised in particular for night deliveries in urban areas and has a range of up to 280 kilometers.

Facelift
The Daily received a facelift in April 2019, now including full LED headlights, and various driver assistance systems have been added.

eDaily (2022) 
eDaily FCEV is a 7-ton large van.

The eDaily FCEV was first unveiled on 19 September 2022. It is equipped with FPT Industrial's maximum output 140 kW electric motor and 90 kW hydrogen fuel cell system. The charging time is about 15 minutes, and it can drive up to 350 km on a single charge with maximum load of 3 tons.

Other variants

 40.10 WM (4 x 4)  light truck series - Officially the VM 90 is the square body military version of the Daily and includes an armored variant.

References

External links

 Official Iveco Daily international site

Daily
Daily
Minibuses
Vans
Electric vans
Pickup trucks
Vehicles introduced in 1978